Lieutenant General Michal Muller  was a South African military commander, who held the post of Chief of the South African Air Force

He joined the Union Defence Force in 1948, training as a Pilot. He served with 2 Squadron SAAF in the Korean War, flying a P-51 Mustang.
After his return to South Africa he served in various posts, including as Commanding Officer of 1 Squadron SAAF, 24 Squadron SAAF and Fighter Command.

He was appointed Chief of Air Staff operations in July 1978 before becoming Chief of the Air Force in December 1979.

After his retirement he served as Ambassador to Chile.

Awards and decorations 
 
 
 
 
  Korea Medal
 
 
 
 
  United Nations Service Medal for Korea 
  Korean War Service Medal

See also
List of South African military chiefs
South African Air Force

References

1930 births
Living people
South African military personnel of the Korean War
South African military personnel of the Border War
Chiefs of the South African Air Force
Ambassadors of South Africa to Chile